Dedee or Dédée is a nickname which may refer to:

 Andrée de Jongh (1916–2007), member of the World War II Belgian Resistance, nicknamed "Dédée"
 DeDee Nathan (born 1968), American retired heptathlete
 Dedee Pfeiffer (born 1964), American actress

See also 

 DD (disambiguation)
 Dede (disambiguation)
 Deede (disambiguation)
 Deedee

Lists of people by nickname